Alena Peterková (born 13 November 1960) is a Czech former long-distance runner. She competed for Czechoslovakia in the women's marathon at the 1992 Summer Olympics in Barcelona.

References

External links
 

1960 births
Living people
Athletes (track and field) at the 1992 Summer Olympics
Czech female long-distance runners
Czech female marathon runners
Olympic athletes of Czechoslovakia
Place of birth missing (living people)